Isabelle Hausser (born 14 November 1953, in Saint-Donat-sur-l'Herbasse in the Drôme department) is a French novelist and translator.

Biography 
She grew up in Sub-Saharan Africa and in Bordeaux. She graduated from the Institut d'études politiques de Bordeaux. She holds a master's degree in public law and is a former student of the École nationale d’administration in Strasbourg.

From 1978 to 1987, she was an administrative judge at the Administrative Tribunal of Paris. Married to the diplomat , she accompanied him in her various posts: in Moscow from 1987 to 1991 where she held diplomatic posts, in Germany, 1994, Brussels, 1998, 2002, New York, Damascus in Syria from 2006 to 2009.

She debuted in 1986 with the novel Célubée which reached several editions. In 1994, she received the prix des Libraires for the novel Nitchevo. In addition to her own works, Isabelle Hausser-Duclos also translated 15 works from the German, English, Czech and Polish languages.

Bibliography

Novels 
1987: Une nuit, Julliard
1993: Nitchevo, de Fallois, prix des libraires 1994
1996: Les magiciens de l'âme, de Fallois
1998: La chambre sourde, de Fallois
2001: La table des enfants, de Fallois, 
2003: Une comédie familiale, de Fallois
2006: Le passage des ombres, de Fallois
2010: Petit Seigneur, de Fallois
2014: Les couleurs du sultan,

Translations 
 1987: Le Chock du futur (Future Shock) by Alvin Toffler,  Éditions Gallimard
 1993: Olympe de Gouges 1748–1793.
 1995: Whisky américain (Amerykańska whiskey) by Andrzej Szczypiorski, de Fallois
 1996: Stefan Zweig, volume 3 : essais, by Stefan Zweig, LGF/Livre de Poche
 1996: Les prodiges de la vie, by Stefan Zweig, LGF
 1997: Album Zweig, by Stefan Zweig, LGF 
 1997: Je voulais l'unité de l'Allemagne, by Helmut Kohl, de Fallois
 1999: Derrick et moi : mes deux vies, by Horst Tappert, de Fallois
 2000: Mort transgénique, by Linda Grant, LGF
 2000: L'heure étoilée du meurtrier (Hvězdná hodina vrahů) by Pavel Kohout, de Fallois, .
 2004: L'incendie. L'Allemagne sous les bombes 1940-1945, by Jörg Friedrich, de Fallois
 2005: Ne tirez pas sur l'oiseau moqueur, by Harper Lee, de Fallois: reworking and updating of the translation and postface
 2006: Le Centre introuvable : la pensée politique des doctrinaires sous la Restauration, by Aurelian Craiutu, Plon
 2008: Le Chirurgien de Campodios, by Wolf Serno, de Fallois
 2009: Louis-Philippe. Le prince et le roi. La France entre deux révolutions by Munro Price, de Fallois

Literary awards 
 1994: prix des libraires for Nitchevo
 2001: grand prix Jean-Giono for La table des enfants
 2002: grand prix des lectrices de Elle for La table des enfants
 2004: prix silhouette du 7e art for Une comédie familiale
 2006: prix du jury des lecteurs de Vivre Plus for Le passage des ombres

References

External links 
 Isabelle Hausser, écrivaine ambassadrice on Le Temps (6 June 2014)
 Isabelle Hausser on Babelio
 ''Les couleurs du Sultan', ou le roman en rouge d’Isabelle Hausser on Syrie MDL
 Isabelle Hausser: les couleurs du Sultan on RTS (13 June 2014)
 Célubée by Isabelle HAUSSER on NooSphere
 "Pardonnez-moi" - L'interview d'Isabelle Hausser on YouTube

École nationale d'administration alumni
20th-century French women writers
20th-century French novelists
21st-century French novelists
German–French translators
English–French translators
Prix des libraires winners
Grand prix Jean Giono recipients
1953 births
People from Drôme
Living people
21st-century French women writers